The Albert-Eden Local Board is one of the 21 local boards of the Auckland Council, and is one of the two boards overseen by the council's Albert-Eden-Puketāpapa ward councillors.

The Albert-Eden board, named after the two volcanic cones in the board area: Mount Albert and Mount Eden, covers the suburbs of Balmoral, Epsom, Greenlane, Kingsland, Morningside, Mount Albert, Mount Eden, Owairaka, Point Chevalier, Sandringham, and Waterview.

The board is governed by eight board members elected from two subdivisions: four from the Owairaka subdivision (western half of the board area), and four from the Maungawhau subdivision (eastern half). The first board members were elected with the nationwide local elections on Saturday 9 October 2010; the local board's second election closed on 12 October 2013.

Population

Albert-Eden Local Board Area had a population of 98,622 at the 2018 New Zealand census, an increase of 3,927 people (4.1%) since the 2013 census, and an increase of 7,644 people (8.4%) since the 2006 census. There were 32,028 households, comprising 48,825 males and 49,794 females, giving a sex ratio of 0.98 males per female. The median age was 34.2 years (compared with 37.4 years nationally), with 16,710 people (16.9%) aged under 15 years, 25,587 (25.9%) aged 15 to 29, 46,386 (47.0%) aged 30 to 64, and 9,942 (10.1%) aged 65 or older.

Ethnicities were 59.7% European/Pākehā, 7.1% Māori, 7.8% Pacific peoples, 32.0% Asian, and 3.8% other ethnicities. People may identify with more than one ethnicity.

The percentage of people born overseas was 41.1, compared with 27.1% nationally.

Although some people chose not to answer the census's question about religious affiliation, 50.5% had no religion, 30.8% were Christian, 0.3% had Māori religious beliefs, 6.2% were Hindu, 2.6% were Muslim, 2.3% were Buddhist and 2.7% had other religions.

Of those at least 15 years old, 35,478 (43.3%) people had a bachelor's or higher degree, and 6,603 (8.1%) people had no formal qualifications. The median income was $38,200, compared with $31,800 nationally. 20,628 people (25.2%) earned over $70,000 compared to 17.2% nationally. The employment status of those at least 15 was that 44,322 (54.1%) people were employed full-time, 12,270 (15.0%) were part-time, and 3,099 (3.8%) were unemployed.

Economy

As of 2018 36% of people were employed in professional roles, making it the largest source of employment in the local board area. 19.9% of people were managers, 10.3% were clerical and administrative workers, and 9.3% were sales workers. 8.7% of Albert-Eden residents were technicians and trade workers.

2019–2022 term
The current board members, elected at the 2019 local body elections, in election order:
Benjamin Lee, C&R – Communities and Residents, (6223 votes)
Margi Watson, City Vision, (5967 votes)
Rachel Langton, C&R – Communities and Residents, (5910 votes)
Lee Corrick, C&R – Communities and Residents, (5639 votes)
Kendyl Smith, C&R – Communities and Residents, (5439 votes)
Julia Maskill, City Vision, (5166 votes)
Christina Robertson, City Vision, (5116 votes)
Graeme Easte, City Vision, (4653 votes)

References

Albert-Eden Local Board Area
Local boards of the Auckland Region